Schiavon is an Italian surname that may refer to
Beniamino Schiavon (born approx. 1900), "Mr. Nino of the Drake", New York maître d'hôtel
Donatella Schiavon (born 1957), Italian swimmer 
Eros Schiavon (born 1983), Italian football player
Lucio Schiavon (born 1976), Italian illustrator
Martina Schiavon (born 1979), Italian water polo player

Italian-language surnames